The Chanza River (Chança in Portuguese) is a river on the Iberian Peninsula. The river arises in the Aracena Mountains in Spain and later forms part of the Portugal–Spain border. The river can be crossed by using the Lower Guadiana International bridge.

See also 
 List of rivers of Portugal
 List of rivers of Spain

Rivers of Spain
Rivers of Andalusia
Rivers of Portugal
International rivers of Europe
Portugal–Spain border
Tributaries of the Guadiana River